Yamaha may refer to:

 Yamaha Corporation, a Japanese company with a wide range of products and services, established in 1887. The company is the largest shareholder of Yamaha Motor Company (below).
 Yamaha Music Foundation, an organization established by the authority of Japanese Ministry of Education for the purpose of promoting music education and music popularization
 Yamaha Pro Audio, a Japanese company specializing in products for the professional audio market
 Yamaha Motor Company, a Japanese motorized vehicle-producing company. The company was established in 1955 upon separation from Yamaha Corporation (above), and is currently one of the major shareholders of Yamaha Corporation (See: Cross ownership).
 Yamaha Júbilo, a Japanese rugby team
 Yamaha Stadium, a football stadium located in Iwata City, Shizuoka Prefecture